Sakie (written: 咲江) is a feminine Japanese given name. Notable people with the name include:

, Japanese cyclist
, Japanese former sprinter
Sakie Yokota (born 1936), Japanese human rights activist
Sakie T. Fukushima, Japanese business executive

Japanese feminine given names